Chris Robinson is an animation, film, literature and sports writer, author of numerous books and artistic director of the Ottawa International Animation Festival (OIAF). He also wrote the screenplay for the Jutra Award and Genie Award-winning animated documentary Lipsett Diaries, directed by Theodore Ushev. In 2020, Robinson was awarded for his Outstanding Contribution to Animation Studies by Animafest Zagreb.

OIAF
Robinson began his association with the OIAF in the early 1990s, while still a film student at Carleton University, coordinating festival submissions and selection committees.

Essays and columns
From 2000 to 2016, Robinson wrote the "Animation Pimp" column for Animation World Magazine. Partially influenced by gonzo journalism and Beat Generation writers, Pimp columns often fused philosophy, history, comedy and memoir in discussing various facets of animation. A selection of columns were later compiled into a book illustrated by German artist and animator, Andreas Hykade. In 2016, Robinson renamed the column, Cheer and Loathing in Animation.

In 2014, Animation World Magazine debuted Robinson's Animation Pimpcast. In this monthly podcast, Robinson sits down with a variety of animation types to fondle their minds through informal chats about animation, life and whatever else they feel like discussing.

Books
Robinson's book Stole This From a Hockey Card: A Philosophy of Hockey, Doug Harvey, Identity & Booze (2005), which was a critical success and was shortlisted for the Ottawa Book Award. In 2013, TV hockey personality Ron Maclean listed Stole This From a Hockey Card as one of his choices of books that could change the nation.

Bibliography
Estonian Animation: Between Genius and Utter Illiteracy (2003)
Ottawa Senators (2004)
Stole This From a Hockey Card: A Philosophy of Hockey, Doug Harvey, Identity & Booze (2005)
Unsung Heroes of Animation (2006)
Great Left Wingers of Hockey's Golden Era (2006)
The Animation Pimp (2007)
Canadian Animation: Looking for a Place to Happen (2008)
Ballad of a Thin Man: In Search of Ryan Larkin (2008)
Love Simple (2009)
Animators Unearthed (2010)
Japanese Animation: Time out of Mind (2010)
Maurice Richard: The Most Amazing Hockey Player Ever (2011)
Mad Eyed Misfits: Writings on Indie Animation (2022)
The Corners are Glowing: Selected Writings from the Ottawa International Animation Festival (September 2022)
Earmarked for Collision: A History of Collage Animation (2023)

Awards
2004: Special Award for Continuing Support of Independent Animated Film (ASIFA-East)
2005: Ottawa Books Awards Finalist for "Stole This From A Hockey Card"
2011: Genie Award for Best Animated Short for "Lipsett Diaries" (directed by Theodore Ushev)
2011: Jutra Award for Best Animated Short Film for "Lipsett Diaries" (directed by Theodore Ushev)
2020: Outstanding Contribution to Animation Studies (Animafest Zagreb)
2022: Le Prix René-Jodoin (for contributions to Canadian animation)

References

Writers from Ottawa
Canadian film historians
Canadian male non-fiction writers
Living people
Sports historians
Film festival directors
Canadian sportswriters
Canadian biographers
Male biographers
Carleton University alumni
Canadian male screenwriters
21st-century Canadian screenwriters
1967 births